The Realm of New Zealand consists of the entire area in which the monarch of New Zealand functions as head of state. The realm is not a federation; it is a collection of states and territories united under its monarch. New Zealand is an independent and sovereign state.  It has one Antarctic territorial claim (the Ross Dependency), one dependent territory (Tokelau), and two associated states (the Cook Islands and Niue). The Realm of New Zealand encompasses the three autonomous jurisdictions of New Zealand, the Cook Islands, and Niue.

The Ross Dependency has no permanent inhabitants, while Tokelau, the Cook Islands and Niue have indigenous populations. The United Nations formally classifies Tokelau as a non-self-governing territory; the Cook Islands and Niue are internally self-governing, with New Zealand retaining responsibility for defence and for most foreign affairs. The governor-general of New Zealand represents the monarch throughout the Realm of New Zealand, though the Cook Islands have an additional king's representative.

Overview
The monarch of New Zealand, personally represented by the governor-general of New Zealand, is the head of state throughout the Realm of New Zealand. The New Zealand monarchy is unitary throughout all jurisdictions in the realm with the headship of state being a part of all equally. The 1983 Letters Patent Constituting the Office of Governor-General of New Zealand define the exact scope of the realm.

The Pacific islands of the Cook Islands and Niue became New Zealand's first colonies in 1901 and then protectorates. From 1965 the Cook Islands became self-governing, as did Niue from 1974. Tokelau came under New Zealand control in 1925 and remains a non-self-governing territory.

The Ross Dependency comprises that sector of the Antarctic continent between 160° east and 150° west longitude, together with the islands lying between those degrees of longitude and south of latitude 60° south. The British (imperial) government took possession of this territory in 1923 and entrusted it to the administration of New Zealand. Neither Russia nor the United States recognises this claim, and the matter remains unresolved (along with all other Antarctic claims) by the Antarctic Treaty, which serves to mostly smooth over these differences. The area is uninhabited, apart from scientific bases.

New Zealand nationality law treats all parts of the realm equally, so most people born in New Zealand, the Cook Islands, Niue, Tokelau and the Ross Dependency before 2006 are New Zealand citizens. Further conditions apply for those born from 2006 onwards.

Governor-general

The governor-general represents the head of state—Charles III, in his capacity as the King of New Zealand—in the area of the realm. Essentially, governors-general take on all the dignities and reserve powers of the head of state. Dame Cindy Kiro took office on 21 October 2021, following the end of Dame Patsy Reddy's term on 28 September 2021.

Entities within the Realm

Cook Islands and Niue

Both the Cook Islands and Niue are self-governing states in free association with New Zealand. The details of their free association arrangement are contained in several documents, such as their respective constitutions, the 1983 Exchange of Letters between the governments of New Zealand and the Cook Islands, and the 2001 Joint Centenary Declaration. As such, the New Zealand Parliament is not empowered to unilaterally pass legislation in respect of these states. In foreign affairs and defence issues New Zealand acts on behalf of these countries, but only with their advice and consent. They do not (currently) make claim to separate sovereignty.

As the governor-general is resident in New Zealand, the Cook Islands Constitution provides for the distinct position of King's Representative. Appointed by the Cook Islands Government, this position is de jure not subordinate to the governor-general and acts as the local representative of the King in right of New Zealand. Since 2013, Sir Tom Marsters is the King's Representative to the Cook Islands.

According to Niue's Constitution of 1974, the governor-general of New Zealand acts as the King's Representative, and exercises the "executive authority vested in the Crown".

In the Cook Islands and Niue, the New Zealand high commissioner is the diplomatic representative from New Zealand. Tui Dewes is the New Zealand High Commissioner to the Cook Islands, and Helen Tunnah is the New Zealand High Commissioner to Niue.

Despite their close relationship to New Zealand, both the Cook Islands and Niue maintain some diplomatic relations in their own name. Both countries maintain high commissions in New Zealand and have New Zealand high commissioners resident in their capitals. In Commonwealth practice, high commissioners represent their governments, rather than the head of state.

New Zealand
New Zealand is a sovereign state. At the United Nations, the country is identified in the General Assembly as simply "New Zealand", not as the Realm of New Zealand.

New Zealand proper consists of the following island groups:
 the North Island, South Island, Stewart Island, and the neighbouring coastal islands such as the Solander Islands, all contained within the 16 regions of New Zealand;
 the Chatham Islands to the east, contained within the Chatham Islands Territory;
 the Kermadec Islands and the Three Kings Islands to the north and the New Zealand Subantarctic Islands to the south, all outside local authority boundaries and inhabited only by a small number of research and conservation staff;
 the Ross Dependency, which forms a part of Antarctica, according to the New Zealand government, is constitutionally a part of New Zealand. However, New Zealand's claim to this part of Antarctica is recognised by only four other countries. In addition, New Zealand's claim to sovereignty is subject to the Antarctic Treaty, which it signed in 1959.

Tokelau
Tokelau has a lesser degree of self-government than the Cook Islands and Niue; it has been moving toward free association status. New Zealand's representative in Tokelau is the administrator of Tokelau (since 2022, Don Higgins), who has the power to overturn rules passed by the General Fono (parliament). In referendums conducted in 2006 and 2007 by New Zealand at the United Nations' request, the people of Tokelau failed to reach the two-thirds majority necessary to attain a system of governance with equal powers to that of the Cook Islands and Niue.

Future of the Realm

A 2016 poll showed 59 per cent of the population supported changing New Zealand's system of government from a monarchy to a republic, with a New Zealand resident as head of state. Should New Zealand become a republic, it would retain the Ross Dependency and Tokelau as dependent territories and the Realm of New Zealand would continue to exist without New Zealand, the Ross Dependency and Tokelau. This would not be a legal hurdle to a New Zealand republic as such, and both the Cook Islands and Niue would retain their free association with New Zealand. Rights to abode and citizenship, codified in New Zealand legislation by the Citizenship Act 1977, would not change.

However, a New Zealand republic would present the issue of continued allegiance to the monarch in the Cook Islands and Niue. Thus, a number of options for the future of the Realm of New Zealand exist should New Zealand become a republic with the Cook Islands and Niue either:
 remaining in free association with New Zealand, but retaining the King as their head of state;
 having the "republican" New Zealand head of state as their head of state and becoming independent states;
 having their own heads of state, but retaining their status of free association with New Zealand.

See also

 Dominion of New Zealand
 History of Nauru – a country where New Zealand was nominal co-trustee during a period of League of Nations mandate and later UN Trust Territory
 History of Samoa – a country formerly under New Zealand administration as League of Nations mandate and UN Trust Territory
 Monarchy of the Cook Islands
 Monarchy of New Zealand
 Monarchy of Niue
 Pitcairn Islands – New Zealand is involved in several aspects of Pitcairn governance, such as law enforcement and the Pitcairn Supreme Court. The UK high commissioner to New Zealand is governor of Pitcairn.

References

Sources

External links
 Letters Patent constituting the office of Governor-General of New Zealand – gives explanation for the term "Realm of New Zealand"
 NZ Ministry of Foreign Affairs and Trade:
 Country profile: Cook Islands
 Country profile: Niue
 About Tokelau
 The Ross Dependency, An Encyclopaedia of New Zealand

 
Government of New Zealand
Constitution of New Zealand
States and territories established in 1983
New Zealand
Government of the Cook Islands
Government of Niue
Government of Tokelau
1983 establishments in Oceania